A Thousand Years may refer to:

 "A Thousand Years" (Christina Perri song)
 "A Thousand Years" (Tom Dice song)
 "A Thousand Years", a song by Toto from the album The Seventh One
 "A Thousand Years", a song by Sting from the album Brand New Day
 A Thousand Years, an art installation by Damien Hirst

See also
 1,000 Years
 Millennium (disambiguation)